was the founder of the Shimazu samurai clan.

According to a record of his life, he was reportedly born in Sumiyoshi Taisha in Osaka. He was initially  but after being given the position of jitō (land steward) of the Shimazu Estate by Minamoto no Yoritomo, he took the name of Shimazu.

Tadahisa was a son of the Shōgun Minamoto no Yoritomo (1147–1199) by the sister of Hiki Yoshikazu.

He then received the domain of Shioda (Shinano province) in 1186 and was then named Shugo of Satsuma province. He sent Honda Sadachika to take possession of the province in his name and accompanied Yoritomo in his expedition to Mutsu in 1189. He went to Satsuma in 1196, subdued Hyūga and Ōsumi provinces, and built a castle in the domain of Shimazu (Hyūga) which name he also adopted. He died in 1227 and was buried in Kamakura, near his father's tomb. His descendants ran the Shimazu clan (named after him) for hundreds of years.

References
Sansom, George (1961). A History of Japan: 1334-1615. Stanford, California: Stanford University Press.
Turnbull, Stephen (1998). The Samurai Sourcebook. London: Cassell & Co.

1227 deaths
Daimyo
Shimazu clan
12th-century Japanese people
13th-century Japanese people